The 1993–94 Arizona Wildcats men's basketball team represented the University of Arizona. The team's head coach was Lute Olson. The team played its home games in McKale Center as members of the Pacific-10 Conference.

After going 14–4 to win the Pac-10 regular-season title the team was seeded second in the West region of the NCAA tournament.  They advanced to the Final Four with a 92–72 victory over top-seeded Missouri before falling 91–82 to Arkansas, who would go on to win the championship.  The team finished with a record of 26–9.

Roster

Schedule and results

|-
!colspan=9 style=| Non-Conference Regular season

|-
!colspan=9 style=| Pac-10 Regular season

|-
!colspan=9 style=| NCAA Tournament

NCAA basketball tournament
Mideast
Arizona (#2 seed) 81, Loyola (#15 Seed) 55
Arizona 71, Virginia (#7 Seed) 58
Arizona 82, Louisville (#3 seed) 70
Arizona 92, Missouri (#1 seed) 72

Final Four
Arkansas 91, Arizona 82

Rankings

Awards and honors
Khalid Reeves – Consensus Second-team All-American
Damon Stoudamire – Honorable mention All-American (AP)

Team players drafted into the NBA

References

Arizona
Arizona Wildcats men's basketball seasons
Arizona
NCAA Division I men's basketball tournament Final Four seasons
Arizona Wildcats
Arizona Wildcats